La Bible amusante pour les grands et les enfants (The Amusing Bible for Grown-ups and Children) was a book by Léo Taxil with illustrations by Frid'rick published in 1882 by Libraire anticléricale, in which he pointed out what he considered to be inconsistencies, errors and false beliefs. At the time of publication the author was accused of irreverently mocking the Bible. The Times called for the book to be suppressed.

References

External links
TheAmusingBible.com

Books about the Bible
French books
Books critical of Christianity